State Route 286 (SR 286) is a short north–south highway in McMinnville, Tennessee.

Route description 
SR 286 begins at an intersection with SR 55 Bus. (S Chancery Street) in southwest McMinnville. It moves northeast as Morrison Street, crossing bridges over Hickory Creek and the Barren Fork River. After the second crossing, the highway ends at SR 380 (Lind Street/W Main Street).

Major intersections

See also 
List of state routes in Tennessee

References

External links
 

286
Transportation in Warren County, Tennessee